Jere Ölander (born 2 October 1989 in Helsinki, Finland) is a professional ice hockey defenceman currently playing for Viikingit in the Finnish II-divisioona. He previously played fourteen games for Jokerit in SM-liiga.

References
https://web.archive.org/web/20100317212328/http://www.sm-liiga.fi/pelaajat/09-10/jokerit/olander-jere.html
http://www.eurohockey.net/players/show_player.cgi?serial=118414

External links

1989 births
Living people
Dunaújvárosi Acélbikák players
Ferencvárosi TC (ice hockey) players
Finnish ice hockey defencemen
HC Gardena players
HSC Csíkszereda players
Jokerit players
KH Sanok players
Kiekko-Laser players
Kiekko-Vantaa players
Ice hockey people from Helsinki
TuTo players
Finnish expatriate ice hockey players in Poland
Finnish expatriate ice hockey players in Romania
Finnish expatriate ice hockey players in Italy
Finnish expatriate ice hockey players in Hungary